Ronald Lee Ermey (March 24, 1944 – April 15, 2018) was an American actor and U.S. Marine drill instructor. He achieved fame for his role as Gunnery Sergeant Hartman in the 1987 film Full Metal Jacket, which earned him a Golden Globe nomination for Best Supporting Actor. Ermey was also a United States Marine Corps staff sergeant and an honorary gunnery sergeant.

Ermey was often typecast in authority figure roles, such as Mayor Tilman in the film Mississippi Burning, Bill Bowerman in Prefontaine, Sheriff Hoyt in The Texas Chainsaw Massacre remake, Jimmy Lee Farnsworth in Fletch Lives, a police captain in Se7en, plastic army men leader Sarge in the first three films of the Toy Story franchise (1995–2010), Lt. "Tice" Ryan in Rocket Power and John House in House.

On television, Ermey hosted two programs on the History Channel: Mail Call, in which he answered viewers' questions about various military issues both modern and historic; and Lock n' Load with R. Lee Ermey, which concerned the development of different types of weapons. He also hosted GunnyTime on the Outdoor Channel.

Early life
Ermey was born in Emporia, Kansas, on March 24, 1944, to John Edward (1924–2016) and Betty (née Pantle) Ermey (1925–2005). A few years after his birth, his father moved the family (including Ermey and his five brothers) to a small farm outside of Kansas City, Kansas. Then, in 1958, when Ermey was 14, his father moved the family to a rural home between Zillah, Washington, and Granger, Washington. As a teenager, Ermey (an admitted "troublemaker and a bit of a hell-raiser"), got into trouble one too many times. His mother took him before a judge to have something done with him, to correct him. The judge gave the young Ermey a choice between military service or jail. Ermey chose military service.

Military career
In 1961, at age 17, Ermey enlisted in the United States Marine Corps and went through recruit training at Marine Corps Recruit Depot San Diego in San Diego, California. He served in the aviation support field for a few years before becoming a drill instructor in India Company, 3rd Recruit Training Battalion, at Marine Corps Recruit Depot San Diego, where he was assigned from 1965 to 1967.

Ermey then served in Marine Wing Support Group 17 at Marine Corps Air Station Futenma on Okinawa, Japan. In 1968, he was ordered to South Vietnam with MWSG-17, and spent 14 months in-country. The remainder of his service was on Okinawa, where he was advanced to Staff Sergeant (E-6). He was medically retired in 1972 because of several injuries. On May 17, 2002, he received an honorary promotion to Gunnery Sergeant (E-7) by the Commandant of the Marine Corps, General James L. Jones.

Ermey regularly took the opportunity to speak with new recruits, visiting the Marine Corps Recruit Depot San Diego in San Diego, California, and the Marine Corps Recruit Depot Parris Island (located within Port Royal, South Carolina, approximately five miles (8.0 km) south of Beaufort). An episode of Mail Call was filmed at the latter of these two training bases.

Acting career

Films
After his discharge from the Marine Corps, Ermey attended the University of Manila in the Philippines, using his G.I. Bill benefits. While there, he was cast in his first film role, playing a Marine drill instructor in Sidney J. Furie's The Boys in Company C (1978). Then, while serving as a technical advisor to director Francis Ford Coppola, he was also cast as a First Air Cavalry helicopter pilot in one scene in Apocalypse Now (1979). Both films were shot in the Philippines. 

For the next few years, Ermey played a series of minor film roles until 1987, when he was cast as drill instructor Gunnery Sergeant Hartman in Stanley Kubrick's Full Metal Jacket. Initially, he was intended to be only the technical advisor. Kubrick changed his mind after Ermey put together an instructional tape, in which he went on an extended tirade at several extras, convincing Kubrick he was the right man for the role. Breaking his word to original actor Tim Colceri, Kubrick gave Colceri's part to Ermey.  Seeking authenticity for the film, Kubrick allowed Ermey to write or edit his own dialogue and improvise on the set, a notable rarity in a Kubrick film. Kubrick later indicated that Ermey was an excellent performer, often needing just two or three takes per scene, also unusual for a Kubrick film. Ermey's performance won critical raves and he was nominated for a Golden Globe Award as Best Supporting Actor.

Ermey later played a drill instructor in the pilot episode of Space: Above and Beyond and the ghost of a drill instructor in the film The Frighteners, both similar to his character in Full Metal Jacket. Ermey eventually appeared in about 60 films, including Purple Hearts (another Vietnam film made in 1984), Mississippi Burning, The Siege of Firebase Gloria (also a Vietnam film, 1989), Dead Man Walking, Se7en, Fletch Lives, Leaving Las Vegas, Prefontaine, Saving Silverman, On Deadly Ground, Sommersby, Life, Man of the House, Toy Soldiers, and The Salton Sea, as well as the remake of Willard, and as an evil sadist in two of The Texas Chainsaw Massacre films.

Ermey also lent his voice to The Grim Adventures of Billy & Mandy, Toy Story, Toy Story 2 and Toy Story 3, as well as Roughnecks and X-Men 3. He usually appeared in a commanding military role, for shows such as Kim Possible, The Simpsons, Family Guy, SpongeBob SquarePants, Rocket Power, The Angry Beavers, Fillmore!, Miami Vice, House, Scrubs, My Life as a Teenage Robot, and Invader Zim. His voice was also briefly heard through a voice disguise machine in Recess: School's Out. In addition, he hosted the documentary series Mail Call and Lock n' Load with R. Lee Ermey.

Television
In 1993 Ermey appeared as the father of Bruce Campbell's character in The Adventures of Brisco County, Jr. for two episodes (1 and 8) of season one.

On December 14, 1994, Ermey played a sheriff in Tales from the Crypt, season six, episode nine, "Staired in Horror". He also played the role of Reverend Patrick Findley, a minister, on The X-Files season 3, episode 11, "Revelations". On Mail Call, Ermey discussed weaponry, tactical matters, and military history. Mail Calls subject matter was dictated by viewer emails; one episode focused on an M1 Abrams tank, while others involved World War II secrets, and others focused on elements of medieval warfare. The set consisted of a military tent, other military gear and weapons, and a World War II jeep.

He had an uncredited role as Sergeant Major Frank Bougus, USMC in the pilot of Space: Above and Beyond.

Ermey traveled to Kuwait in June 2003 during the first phase of Operation Iraqi Freedom to film mail distribution by the Defense Department to service personnel for an episode of Mail Call. According to a 2005 episode of Mail Call filmed at Whiteman Air Force Base, he was the 341st person to fly in the B-2 stealth bomber. He also guest-starred in the episode "Second Chance" of Human Target.

Ermey also made guest appearances on the television drama House, playing the role of Dr. Gregory House's father, who was a decorated naval aviator while serving in the Marine Corps ("Birthmarks", "Daddy's Boy"), and the sitcom Scrubs, playing the Janitor's father. He also voiced Wildcat in several episodes of Batman: The Brave and the Bold. In two episodes of The Simpsons entitled "Sideshow Bob's Last Gleaming" and "Waiting for Duffman", Ermey voiced Colonel Leslie "Hap" Hapablap.

In the episode of SpongeBob SquarePants "Inmates of Summer", he voiced an irate warden of a maximum-security island prison who demoralized the inmates whenever he could. In the episode of The Angry Beavers "Fancy Prance", he voiced the Lipizzaner stallions' instructor, Drill Sergeant Goonther.

In 2009, Ermey hosted a second History Channel show entitled Lock n' Load with R. Lee Ermey, which discussed the history of various weapons used by militaries of today.

In late 2010, Ermey starred in a GEICO commercial as a drill-instructor-turned-therapist who insults a client, in a parody of some of his iconic characters. Ermey was also featured each week on ESPN's College GameDay. His role was to insult the experts' incorrect picks from the previous week. In that same year, Ermey appeared in the Law & Order: Special Victims Unit episode "Trophy" as a paroled sex offender.

In 2011, Ermey starred as a drill instructor on the X-Play special on Bulletstorm. In the Family Guy episode "Grumpy Old Man", Ermey guest-starred, again as a drill instructor.

Ermey served as host of GunnyTime, a program that debuted on Outdoor Channel in 2015.

Video games
In 1993, Ermey played Lyle The Handyman in the full motion video game Mega-CD/Sega CD game Double Switch. In 1996, he was the player character's superior officer in Earthsiege 2.

Ermey lent his voice to several video games, including Fallout Tactics: Brotherhood of Steel (as General Barnaky) and Crash Bandicoot: The Wrath of Cortex (as Wa-Wa). He also made a cameo in Real War: Air, Land, Sea, a real-time strategy video game based on the official Joint Chiefs of Staff training game. In 2014, he did voice-over work for Call of Duty: Ghosts.

Several characters have made references to Ermey and the character of Hartman. In the game Fallout 3, a recruitable companion is named Sergeant RL-3, a modified military robot with a personality very similar to Ermey (the companion's name is a reference to Ermey's initials wherein the 3 is leetspeak for the letter E). In the World of Warcraft: Cataclysm expansion there is a character named "Lieutenant Emry" that speaks some of Ermey's signature lines from Full Metal Jacket. In Half-Life: Opposing Force, the drill sergeant from the initial boot camp stage had dialogue and mannerisms very similar to Ermey's character in Full Metal Jacket.

Commercials
Ermey was an official spokesman for Black Book (National Auto Research), Glock firearms, TRU-SPEC apparel, Tupperware, Victory Motorcycles, Hoover, SOG Specialty Knives, WD-40, Young Marines, and appeared in commercials for Coors Light, Dick's Sporting Goods, GEICO, and pistachio nuts. He provided the introduction for the Professional Bull Riders. He can be seen giving a service announcement for Alamo Drafthouse Cinemas, demanding that viewers be quiet during the film. He was a board member of the National Rifle Association.

Personal life
Ermey married his wife, Nila, in 1975. They had four children and remained married until his death.

Business venture
Ermey was a co-founder of Bravery Brewing in Lancaster, California.

Military appearances
On May 17, 2002, Ermey received an honorary post-service promotion to gunnery sergeant (E-7) from the Commandant of the Marine Corps General James L. Jones in recognition of his continuing support to Americans in military service.

He conducted morale tours, visiting United States troops in locations such as Al Kut, Iraq, and Bagram Airfield, Afghanistan, in which he filmed parts for his television show Mail Call. While at Bagram Airfield, he held a USO-type show in which he portrayed GySgt Hartman and conducted a comedy routine. He also did the same at Doha, Qatar and Camp Doha, Kuwait City, Kuwait, in 2003.

Political views
Ermey described himself as an independent. In the 2008 presidential election, Ermey voted for Barack Obama, but subsequently criticized his economic policies, accusing him of attempting to "impose socialism" on the American people and "destroying the country." Ermey said in a 2015 interview that he supported Texas Senator Ted Cruz for president. He said, "You know what, I just watched Ted Cruz – I mean, what a tough act to follow. I'm not going to tell you who I'm going to vote for, but I'm going to let you guess [...] and the first two guesses don't count!" He would later endorse presidential candidate Donald Trump. Ermey was a strong supporter of the Second Amendment and a board member of the National Rifle Association.

Death
Ermey died at a hospital in Santa Monica, California, from complications related to pneumonia on the morning of April 15, 2018, aged 74. His funeral was held in Arlington National Cemetery on Friday, January 18, 2019.

Awards and decorations

Ermey was retroactively awarded the Marine Corps Drill Instructor Ribbon after he retired from the military due to his prior service as a Marine Corps recruit training instructor. Ermey's military awards included:

Filmography

Other media

 Ermey recorded voice lines for a "talking" 12-inch tall "motivational action figure" depicting him in USMC drill instructor uniform, which replays his signature put-downs with the press of an electronic button on the back. Sideshow Collectibles manufactured the figure in two versions, one with (somewhat) family-friendly language and one with "extra-salty" remarks that include profanity; the latter is packaged with an R rating as a warning to consumers. One of these figures appears occasionally on Mail Call, wherein it is often referred to as 'Mini-Lee' by the host, and is sometimes seen berating a G.I. Joe.
 In the early 1990s, he appeared as a Martian pilot in a training video for Virtual World Entertainment's game Red Planet.
 In the Green Lantern series of comics published by DC, it is revealed that Green Lantern Kilowog, who trains all new Green Lantern recruits, was in turn trained by a Green Lantern named Ermey.
 He had a notable appearance on The Howard Stern Show in October 2002, appearing on the show as GySgt Hartman.
 He provided the voice of the DLC drill instructor in Call of Duty: Ghosts.
 He starred in an instructional training video for Lockheed Martin dealing with the problems caused by Foreign Object Damage in manufacturing military equipment.
 Avenue N in Palmdale, CA was successfully petitioned to be renamed "R. Lee Ermey Avenue" in memoriam of the Antelope Valley resident.

See also

References

External links

 
 
 
 

1944 births
2018 deaths
20th-century American male actors
21st-century American male actors
American expatriates in the Philippines
American gun rights activists
American male film actors
American male television actors
American male voice actors
Audiobook narrators
Burials at Arlington National Cemetery
California Independents
Deaths from pneumonia in California
Kansas Independents
Male actors from Kansas
Military personnel from Kansas
People from Emporia, Kansas
People from Palmdale, California
People from Yakima County, Washington
United States Marine Corps personnel of the Vietnam War
United States Marine Corps non-commissioned officers
University of Manila alumni